Marie Mariusovna Petipa (17 (29) October 1857 – 16 January 1930) was a noted Russian ballerina. She was born in St. Petersburg, the daughter of Marius Petipa (under whom she studied) and Maria Petipa. Her debut was at the Mariinsky Theatre in 1875 in Le Dahlia bleu and her dancing career, mainly in the character dance repertoire, lasted until 1907, although she performed on rare occasions through 1911.

At the height of her career, Petipa was one of the most known ballerinas in St. Petersburg. Her portraits were drawn by the well-known artists (a portrait of her by Konstantin Makovsky has survived), her private life was discussed in the newspapers, and her 25th career anniversary in 1901 was widely celebrated in St. Petersburg. Vlas Doroshevich wrote a lengthy article on this occasion titled Goddess of Joy and Merriment. Petipa went on many tours abroad and was awarded Ordre des Palmes Académiques in France.

She was in a civil marriage with the dancer Sergei Legat (1875-1905), who was much younger than her. Petipa left theater two years after her husband committed suicide.

At the time of the October Revolution of 1917, Petipa was sixty years old. The revolution took everything away from her: she lost both her house and her pension and was left with nothing, not even money for food. She pleaded to the Soviet government for assistance but received no help. The only help came from the fellow actors, who, however, were unable to sustain her permanently. Her second plea to the government for a pension was rejected as well. In 1928, she moved to Paris, where she lived in poor conditions. Petipa died in 1930 and was buried near Paris. The money paid for the funeral was only enough for five years, after which she was reburied in a common grave.

According to the Soviet sources, Petipa lead Legat to commit suicide and then married a businessman in 1910, getting ten million francs as a result. Nevertheless, the Directorate of the Academic Theaters petitioned to grant Petipa a pension in 1924. According to the same sources, Petipa emigrated to Paris in 1926 where she had two strokes and died of impulsive insanity.

See also
List of Russian ballet dancers

References

Notes

Sources

1857 births
1930 deaths
Ballerinas from the Russian Empire
People from the Russian Empire of French descent